Carl Kilpatrick (born May 16, 1956) is a retired American professional basketball player. A 6'10" center, he attended Northeast Louisiana University (now the University of Louisiana at Monroe) and was selected by the New Orleans Jazz with the sixth pick in the eighth round of the 1978 NBA draft. During the summer, he averaged 18.5 points and 14 rebounds in the New Orleans Summer Professional League. He was cut by the Jazz before the start of the season and later signed with Montana Sky of the Western Basketball Association. In September 1979, he signed with the Jazz. He spent the majority of the season on the injury list, appearing in two games at the end of the season.

In the 1980–1981 season, Kilpatrick played 22 games for Tampereen Pyrintö of Finland. The team went to the SM-sarja finals, where they lost to Torpan Pojat and gained silver medals.

Kilpatrick's son Austin played for the Idaho State University Bengals men's basketball team.

Notes

External links
NBA statistics at Basketball Reference

1956 births
Living people
American expatriate basketball people in Finland
American men's basketball players
Basketball players from Louisiana
Centers (basketball)
Junior college men's basketball players in the United States
Kilgore College alumni
Louisiana–Monroe Warhawks men's basketball players
New Orleans Jazz draft picks
People from Bastrop, Louisiana
Tampereen Pyrintö players
Utah Jazz players